This is a list of career statistics of Estonian professional tennis player Anett Kontaveit since her professional debut in 2010. So far, Kontaveit has won six WTA Tour level singles titles, winning four of them in 2021. She also has 11 singles and five doubles titles on the International Tennis Federation Circuit (ITF). At the 2020 Australian Open, she reached her first and so far only Grand Slam quarterfinals, but also became first Estonian to reach that stage there. As a junior, she reached one Grand Slam final at the 2012 US Open. In June 2022, she became world No. 2. 

During the season of 2021, she set some records. In late October, after winning her fourth title of the year, she entered top 10 for the first time. In addition, she bought her card for the WTA Finals, also becaming first Estonian to achieve that. Making debut there, she passed group and later reached final where she lost to Garbiñe Muguruza. At the year-end ranking of 2021, she became first Estonian to finish year inside top 10. During the season of 2021, she had record of 48 wins, tying with Ons Jabeur for the most wins on tour.

Performance timelines

Only main-draw results in WTA Tour, Grand Slam tournaments, Fed Cup/Billie Jean King Cup and Olympic Games are included in win–loss records.

Singles
Current after the 2023 Abu Dhabi Open.

Doubles
Current through the 2022 Tallinn Open.

Significant finals

WTA Finals

Singles: 1 (1 runner-up)

WTA 1000 finals

Singles: 2 (2 runner-ups)

WTA career finals

Singles: 17 (6 titles, 11 runner-ups)

ITF Circuit finals

Singles: 14 (11 titles, 3 runner–ups)

Doubles: 8 (5 titles, 3 runner–ups)

Junior Grand Slam finals

Girls' singles: 1 (runner–up)

WTA ranking
Current after the 2022 Cincinnati Open.

WTA Tour career earnings
Current after the 2022 Tallinn Open

Grand Slam statistics

Seedings

Best Grand Slam results details

Head-to-head records

Record against top 10 players
Kontaveit's record against players who have been ranked in the top 10. Active players are in boldface.

Record against No. 11–20 players
Kontaveit's record against players who have been ranked world No. 11–20. Active players are in boldface:

  Jennifer Brady 2–0
  Ana Konjuh 2–0
  Eleni Daniilidou 1–0
  Donna Vekić 1–0
  Kaia Kanepi 1–0
  Beatriz Haddad Maia 1–0
  Wang Qiang 1–0
  Anastasia Pavlyuchenkova 4–2
  Anastasija Sevastova 2–1
  Kirsten Flipkens 1–1
  Mirjana Lučić-Baroni 1–1
  Elise Mertens 2–3
  Alizé Cornet 1–2
  Petra Martić 1–2
  Markéta Vondroušová 1–2
  Barbora Strýcová 1–2
  Shahar Pe'er 0–1
  Daria Saville 0–1
  Mihaela Buzărnescu 0–1
  Alison Riske 0–2
  Elena Vesnina 0–2
  Karolína Muchová 0–2

No. 1 wins

Top 10 wins

Double bagel matches (6–0, 6–0)

Matches without dropping/winning a single game

Longest winning streaks

12-match win streak (2021)

22-match indoor court winning streak (2021–22)

Notes

References

External links
 
 
 Anett Kontaveit at CoreTennis

Kontaveit, Anett